College Hall is the oldest building on the West Philadelphia campus of the University of Pennsylvania. Prior to its construction, the university was located on Ninth Street in Center City, Philadelphia. The building was designed by Thomas Webb Richards and completed in 1873. The characteristic green color of the building is due to its composition of green serpentine stone.

College Hall was placed on the National Register of Historic Places February 14, 1978. It is also a contributing property of the University of Pennsylvania Campus Historic District.

The building currently houses the undergraduate admissions office, the university president's offices, the Department of History, and classrooms. The top floor of College Hall is also home to the Philomathean Society, a literary society founded in 1813.

Although College Hall and the now-demolished Blanchard Hall were rumored to be the model for the Victorian Gothic mansion in The Addams Family cartoons, the cartoonist Charles Addams repeatedly denied the claims.

Gallery

References

National Register of Historic Places in Philadelphia
University of Pennsylvania campus
School buildings completed in 1873
University and college buildings on the National Register of Historic Places in Pennsylvania
Individually listed contributing properties to historic districts on the National Register in Pennsylvania
1873 establishments in Pennsylvania